The M-17 main road is a main road in Bosnia and Herzegovina. The road is a part of European route E73. It runs from northern Croatian border in Šamac towards southern Croatian border in Doljani near Čapljina.

Highways in Bosnia and Herzegovina